Walter Richard Evans (January 15, 1920 – July 10, 1999) was a noted American control theorist and the inventor of the root locus method and the Spirule device in 1948. He was the recipient of the 1987 American Society of Mechanical Engineers Rufus Oldenburger Medal and the 1988 AACC's Richard E. Bellman Control Heritage Award.

Biography
He was born on January 15, 1920, and received his B.E. in Electrical Engineering from Washington University in St. Louis in 1941 and his M.E. in Electrical Engineering from the University of California, Los Angeles in 1951.

Evans worked as an engineer at several companies, including General Electric, Rockwell International, and Ford Aeronautic Company.

He published a book named "Control System Dynamics" with McGraw-Hill in 1954.

He had four children. One of his children, Gregory Walter Evans, wrote an article about his father in the December 2004 issue of the IEEE Control Magazine.

Evans was taught to play chess by his grandmother, Eveline Allen Burgess, the American Women's Chess Champion from 1907 to 1920.

References
Gregory Walter Evans, "Bringing root locus to the classroom: the story of Walter R. Evans and his textbook Control System Dynamics", IEEE Control Magazine, pp. 74–81, December 2004.

External links
 Biography
 Memoriam
 Spirule

1920 births
1999 deaths
Control theorists
American electrical engineers
Richard E. Bellman Control Heritage Award recipients
McKelvey School of Engineering alumni
UCLA Henry Samueli School of Engineering and Applied Science alumni